Claude Driskett Hopkins (August 24, 1903 – February 19, 1984) was an American jazz stride pianist and bandleader.

Biography
Claude Hopkins was born in Alexandria, Virginia, United States. Historians differ in respect of the actual date of his birth. His parents were on the faculty of Howard University. A talented stride piano player and arranger, he left home at the age of 21 to become a sideman with the Wilbur Sweatman Orchestra, but stayed less than a year. In 1925, he left for Europe as the musical director of The Revue Negre which starred Josephine Baker with Sidney Bechet in the band.

He returned to the US in 1927 where, based in Washington D.C., he toured the TOBA circuit with The Ginger Snaps Revue before heading once again for New York City where he took over the band of Charlie Skeets. At this time (1932–36), he led a Harlem band employing jazz musicians such as Edmond Hall, Jabbo Smith and Vic Dickenson (although his records were arranged to feature his piano more than his band). This was his most successful period, with long residencies at the Savoy and Roseland ballrooms and at the Cotton Club. In 1937, he took his band on the road with a great deal of success.

The high-pitched vocals of Orlando Roberson (Orlando Herbert Roberson 1909–1977) were a feature of the band's work. It included Ovie Alston, Fernando Arbello, Shirley Clay, Vic Dickenson, Edmond Hall, Arville Harris, Pete Jacobs, Sylvester Lewis, Ben Smith, and Jabbo Smith.

He broke up the band in 1940 and used his arranging skills while working for several non-jazz band leaders and for CBS. In 1948/9 he led a "novelty" band briefly but took a jazz band into The Cafe Society in 1950. From 1951 until his death, he remained in New York City, working mostly as a sideman with other Dixieland bands at festivals, New York clubs, and recording. He died on February 19, 1984.

Discography

As leader
 Music of the Early Jazz Dances (20th Fox, 1958)
 Yes Indeed! with Buddy Tate and Emmett Berry (Swingville, 1960)
 Let's Jam with Buddy Tate and Joe Thomas (Swingville, 1961)
 Swing Time! with Budd Johnson and Vic Dickenson (Swingville, 1963)
 The Jazz Giants with Wild Bill Davison, Buzzy Drootin, Herb Hall, Benny Morton and Arvell Shaw (Sackville, 1968)
 Soliloquy (Sackville, 1972)
 Crazy Fingers (Chiaroscuro, 1973)
 Safari Stomp (Black and Blue, 1974)
 Jazz Piano Masters: Live at the New School (Chiaroscuro, 1977)

As sideman
With Red Allen
 Jazz at the Metropole Cafe with Cozy Cole, Charlie Shavers (Bethlehem, 1955)
 At Newport with Kid Ory, Jack Teagarden (Verve, 1957)

With Cozy Cole
 After Hours with Jimmy McPartland (Grand Award, 1956)
 Cozy Cole and His Big Seven (Grand Award, 1958
 Caravan (Grand Award, 1959)
 Cozy Cole and Other All-Time Jazz Stars (Colortone, 1959)

With Bud Freeman
The Bud Freeman All-Stars featuring Shorty Baker (Swingville, 1960)

With Coleman Hawkins
 Things Ain't What They Used to Be (Swingville, 1961)
 Years Ago (Prestige, 1964)
 Dear Old Southland (Membran, 2005)

With Lonnie Johnson
Blues by Lonnie Johnson (Bluesville, 1960)

With Ma Rainey
 Blame It on the Blues (Milestone, 1969)

References

1903 births
1984 deaths
American jazz bandleaders
American jazz pianists
American male pianists
Big band bandleaders
Stride pianists
Swing pianists
Brunswick Records artists
Columbia Records artists
20th-century American male musicians
American male jazz musicians
20th-century American pianists
Sackville Records artists
Black & Blue Records artists